Lào Cai is a province of the mountainous Northwest region of Vietnam bordering the province of Yunnan in China. The province covers an area of 6,383.9 square kilometres and as of 2008 it had a population of 602,300 people.

Lào Cai and Sa Pa are two important cities within the province at the border with China; the former is well known as key trading post and the latter is hill station famous for tourism, in the Northwest region of Vietnam. Lào Cai is also the capital of Lào Cai province and shares border with the city of Hekou, in the Yunnan province of Southwest China. This border town was closed after the 1979 war with China, since reopened in 1993, has become a major tourist centre between Hanoi, Sa Pa and Kunming (China). Sa Pa is notable as a hill resort and market centre for the local ethnic Hmong, including the Red, Black, Green and Flower Hmong. Located across the Muong Hoa Valley from Vietnam's highest mountain, Fansipan, the city is sometimes referred to as the "queen of mountains".

Lào Cai has many historical sites, natural caves and produces agricultural specialties such as Bắc Hà plums.

In a 1929 survey conducted in the area, the vegetation (flora) and fauna (mammals) recorded  by the French biologist Delacour who accompanied Theodore Roosevelt were unique to the region in northern Vietnam.

Etymology
The name "Lao-Kay" has been used by the French since the colonial era in their writing, pronounced as "Lào Cai" by the Vietnamese. The latter became official usage and spelling after November 1950.

The origin of the province's name is unclear and there are several explanations. The area in the ward of Cốc Lếu was the site of an old commercial district that developed into a market town. Because of this it was called Lão Nhai (老街, literally Phố Cũ, Old Town), in Hmong language it is pronounced as "Lao Cai". After this a new market town was developed and named Tân Nhai (新街, today Phố Mới, New Town). The word Lào Cai is sourced to "Lao Kai" which appeared as Jean Dupuis led a naval expedition up the Red River and in 1879 published the Map of Tonkin, in which the location was marked as "Lao-kai, residence du Chef des Pavillone noirs" (residence of the Head of Black Flag Army). According to Professor Đào Duy Anh, it derives from the word "Lão Nhai". While making maps, the French wrote it as "Lao-Kay" and this word was used by them in documents. When reading, the Vietnamese pronounced it Lào Cai and this has persisted since.

Geography and climate

It borders the provinces of Hà Giang, Yên Bái, Sơn La, and Lai Châu, as well as the province of Yunnan in the People's Republic of China.

There are ten major soil groups under 30 categories in the province, under ten land groups.

Climate
As the province is mostly mountainous, it experiences a dry cold climate from October to March, while the tropical monsoon is  rainy season, which lasts from April to September. Fog and frost are a common phenomenon in the province.

Water resources
Lào Cai is a mountainous region. In the northwest of the province is Phan Xi Păng (also called Fansipan; elevation , snow covered during winter season), Vietnam's highest mountain. It is located in the Hoàng Liên Sơn and the Hoàng Liên National Park. The Sa Pa Mountains form the western part of the province. While the province is drained by over 100 rivers, the main river that bisects the province is the Red River,, the most significant river of northern Vietnam, which flows out of China towards the capital Hanoi. Other rivers of significance are the Chay and Nam Ti Rivers. Much of the province is heavily forested.

Ground water resources have been estimated reserves as 4,448 million cubic metres out of which good quality water is estimated as 30 million cubic metres. In addition, there are four mineral water sources.

Mineral resources
The province has rich mineral resources, 30 types have been identified with good reserves. The major valuable mineral reserves are: Copper (53 million tons), molybdenum (15 million tons), apatite and iron (2.5 billion tons). There are 150 mines in the province exploiting various minerals.

Flora and fauna

The forests feature 442 species, including various types of birds, insects and frogs. The province has a rich forest reserve known for its many species of rare timber plants; some of the well known species are: po mu (fukiena), lat hoa (chukrasia tabularis), and cho chi, apart from many species of medicinal herbs.

In the Fansipan mountain ranges, vegetation varies with altitude, with elevation above  retaining the forests. Above  elevation, the mountain range has undersized vegetation with many bamboos and rhododendrons.

The Hoang Lien National Park has only  of forest left as a result of anthropogenic pressure over centuries. Grass, bushes and small trees are seen on the land which are devoid of forests, and large areas are used for cultivation; ginger plantation, as a cash crop is widespread.

According to a 1929 survey conducted in the area, the fauna (mammals) recorded  by the French biologist Delacour who accompanied Theodore Roosevelt were: the clouded leopard (Neofelis nebuiosa), leopard (Panthera pardus), tiger (panthera tigris), binturong (Arctictus binturong) and black gibbon (Hylobates concolor), the stump-tailed macaque (Macaca arctoides), and Asiatic black bear (Selenarctos thibetanus). In Sa Pa forests, 150 species of birds were recorded such as the red-vented barbet ( Megalaima lagrandieri), collared finchbill (Spizixo semitoroues), white-throated laughingthrush (Garrulax albogularis) and the chestnut bulbul (Hypsipetes castanotus); all species are considered exclusive to North Vietnam.

History

Lào Cai has been known since ancient times as a historic trading post. Here, the Chinese, the Vietnamese and the ethnic minorities of the region fought to gain control of the region. In 1463, the Viet Kings established Lào Cai as the capital of their northernmost region, then named as Hưng Hóa. It came under French colonial rule in 1889 and was their administrative town, and also served as a military garrison. In the early 19th century the first railway line was built from Hanoi to this region. It took seven years to complete but at the cost of 25,000 lives of Vietnamese conscripted labour.

In late 1978, the Vietnamese invaded Cambodia. In retaliation, the Chinese, as allies of Cambodia, countered and invaded North Vietnam with the aim of "teaching the Vietnamese a lesson". The attack was launched by 200,000 strong People's Liberation Army. They occupied territory from Paso (previously known as Phon Tho) in the Northwest to Cao Bằng and Lạng Sơn in the Northwest. Even though the Chinese suffered heavy casualties, they managed to conquer these cities, and declared that the gate to Hanoi was open and that their punitive mission had been achieved. On the way back to the Chinese border, the PLA destroyed all local infrastructure and housing and looted all useful equipment and resources (including livestock), which were mainly donated by China to support Vietnam's economy prior to the war, severely weakening the economy of Vietnam's northernmost provinces. The PLA crossed the border back into China on March 16. Both sides declared victory with China claiming to have crushed the Vietnamese resistance and Vietnam claiming that China had fought mostly against border militias.

After the province was invaded by the Chinese in 1979 from its border town Lào Cai, the border with China was closed for several years. In this war, the city of Lào Cai was destroyed by the Chinese. Remnants of the war in the form of land mines are reported to pose threat to people along the border with China.

The Lào Cai town at the border town on the bank of Red River as the provincial capital has now prospered in view of large trade with China and is a booming city with a community of many rich millionaires. Since 2006,  Lào Cai has the status of  a city, is the largest town in the region and strategically very important. An airport is planned to be built by 2020.

Administrative divisions
Lào Cai is subdivided into 9 district-level sub-divisions:

They are further subdivided into 8 commune-level towns (or townlets), 144 communes, and 12 wards.

Table of local government divisions

Economy

Traditional economic activities such as agriculture and forestry remain important, but the province has also been attempting to develop foreign investment in the area. Cross-border trade with China is also a growing source of income, as is tourism centred on trekking up the peak of Fansipan, Vietnam's highest mountain. Ecotourism is gaining ground. Agriculture and forestry constitute 78.07% of economic activity; fishing and aquaculture 0.04%, mining 1.62%; manufacturing 2.37%, power and water 0.22%, construction 3.29%, repairmen 3.48%; hospitality 0.90%, communications 1.31%; finance 0.21%, science and technology 0.05%;, education and research 3.57%; health and social work 0.69%; cultural activities 0.24% and several other small sectors.

As against the national figure of 7,592 cooperatives, there are 19 cooperatives in the province, out of which 17 are agricultural cooperatives and one is a fisheries cooperative. There are only 253 farms as compared to the national number of 120,699. The output value of agriculture produce at constant 1994 prices in the province was 663 billion đồngs against the national value of 156,681.9 billion đồngs.

In 2008, the province produced 199,800 tonnes of cereals compared to the national production of 43.68 million tonnes.

In 2007, the industrial output of the province was a meagre 1,916.2 bill. đồngs against the national output of 1.47 million billion đồngs.

Lào Cai has 150 mines or mining locations of 30 different categories, some of which are the largest of their kind in the country. These include the apatite mine at Cam Đường with 2.5 billion tonnes, the iron mine at Quý Xa with 124 million tons, the copper mine at Sin Quyền with 53 million tons, the molybdenum mine at Ô Quy Hồ with 15,400 tons.

In recent years the government of Vietnam has encouraged reforestation in the province, because of the importance of wood for fuel and development and for environmental reasons. Tree planting has been ordered particularly in Sa Pa.

Demographics

With more than 20 ethnic groups, Lào Cai is a melting pot of cultures and history. Ethnic Vietnamese are the majority, especially since 1960 when the North Vietnamese government followed a policy of settling communist party cadres from lowland areas in upland areas, then predominantly occupied by tribes. The male population during this period was 303,300 with females accounting for 299,000. The urban population was 125,900 against an urban population of 476,400 (about 25% of the rural population).

The province has 25 of Vietnam's ethnic minority groups accounting for 64.09% of its population. The distribution of the ethnic minorities comprises: Kinh - 35.9%, Hmong - 22.21%, Tay - 15.84%, Dao -14.05%, Giay - 4.7%, Nùng 4.4% and the others belong to Phu La, San Chay, Ha Nhi, and the La Chi groups.

Languages spoken in Lào Cai province include the following.
Hmong–Mien languages
Hmong
Kim Mun
Tai languages
Nùng
Tày (Tày Sa Pa, etc.)
Giáy (Bouyei) - Bát Xát District, Mường Khương District, Bảo Yên District
Tibeto-Burman languages
Phula - Bát Xát District, Mường Khương District, Bắc Hà District
Laghuu - Bát Xát District, Sa Pa, Văn Bàn District, Bảo Thắng District

Hoàng Liên National Park
The Hoàng Liên National Park is located within the province and was upgraded from a nature reserve in 2006. The area was surveyed by French biologist Delacour in 1929 who had accompanied Theodore Roosevelt to an expedition in southeast Asia. He collected 48 mammal species for the Chicago Natural History Museum although most were shot. Sediments in the park date back to the Mesozoic era, whilst the granite is a Palaeocene intrusion. The northwestern boundary of the national park is made with a rugged boundary of marble and metamorphosed calcium carbonate.

Transport

Lào Cai is one of the few mountainous provinces with well-developed transport networks consisting of roads, rail and waterways. An airport is planned in Bao Yen District. The provincial city is connected by road, rail and river transport links with Hanoi on its northwest and to Yunnan province in China. Within the province, road links exist to Sa Pa and Bắc Hà. The Haiphong railway to Yunnan is of strategic importance.  There are four national highways totaling to a length of 400 km, provincial roads of about 300 km length and 1,000 km of village roads.

It can carry 1 billion tonnes of freight per year and thousands per day. Plans for a high-speed rail link between Hanoi and Lào Cai has been investigated by the Ministry of Transport and the Asian Development Bank. This is expected to create a high-speed rail corridor from Kunming – Lào Cai – Hanoi – Haiphong.

Red River flowing through the province provides water transport facilities though its transportation capacity is limited.
The planned Sapa Airport Project was approved by the government of Vietnam and will be built in this province in the Q4/2021.

Visitor attractions

As Lào Cai province is mountainous and still developing, its natural environment is relatively environmentally unspoilt. This means that its potential as an ecotourism destination among Vietnamese and foreigners is still intact. It has now become popular and a novel experience among both Chinese and Vietnamese as a tourist destination, particularly a "sexualized and sensualised" border town of Lào Cai. Special border travel packages for tourists, arranged between China and Vietnam under the present political set up in Vietnam, has relaxed regulations permitting tourists to visit selected locations under conducted tours to places in Northern Vietnam and particularly to the provincial headquarter of Lào Cai; Lào Cai is the last stop before crossing into China on way to Kunming across the border, which lies at the end of the train line to China. Since then the Chinese tourists visiting Lào Cai on a one-day trip or two days trip including the hill station town of Sa Pa in the province (a popular five trip is also organized covering Lào Cai, Hanoi, Hạ Long and Hai Phong) recorded a quantum jump, from 4200 in 1995 to 176,310 in 2002. Lào Cai is popular among Chinese travellers (males, in particular) who are said to be "obsessed with  Zhao Xiaojie ("looking for misses") for its sex market. A male tourist from China made a mention: "There is a common saying in China: Vietnam sacrifices one generation of young women for the well-being of  the next three generations."
A popular motorbiking route among tourists that covers the mountainous region of the province known as the "Tonkinese Alps", is to start from the White Thai villages, Sơn La, historic site of Dien Bien Phu and terminating at Sa Pa.

Sa Pa is one of 21 national tourism areas in Vietnam. It is 38 km away from the border town of Lào Cai. Visit to Sapa town is said to be more popular among visitors from Western countries in view of its attraction of ethnic tribals. In fact, the French had established a Travel Bureau, as early as 1917, and the town was popular among the "French colonist" all through their rule as a hill resort. However, Sa Pa has gone through several rounds of destruction between 1947 and 1953, and again in 1979 due to war with French and Chinese. It has been partly restored and has gradually become a tourist hub since the region was opened to tourism in 1993. A good time to visit Sa Pa would be when rice fields in different green shades are being harvested in the fall season (September to November). The colours of the rice fields indicate the time for harvesting various plots. The women of the ethnic minority tribes who harvest the crops on the fields further accentuate the different green shades of the fields with their eye-catching red and indigo-coloured dresses.

Lào Cai has many historic sites, natural caves and produces agricultural specialties such as Bắc Hà plums.

References

External links
Lao Cai Provincial Government website 

 
Northwest (Vietnam)
Hani people
Provinces of Vietnam